The depressor labii inferioris (or quadratus labii inferioris) is a facial muscle. It helps to lower the bottom lip.

Structure 
The depressor labii inferioris muscle arises from the lateral surface of the mandible. This is below the mental foramen, and the origin may be around 3 cm wide. It inserts on the skin of the lower lip, blending in with the orbicularis oris muscle around 2 cm wide. At its origin, depressor labii is continuous with the fibers of the platysma muscle. Some yellow fat is intermingled with the fibers.

Nerve supply 
The depressor labii inferioris muscle is supplied by the marginal mandibular branch of the facial nerve.

Function 
The depressor labii inferioris muscle helps to depress and everts the lower lip. It is the most important of the muscles of the lower lip for this function. It is an antagonist of the orbicularis oris muscle. It is needed to expose the mandibular (lower) teeth during smiling.

Clinical significance

Resection 
The depressor labii inferioris muscle may be resected (cut and removed) using surgery to correct an asymmetry of the lower lip when smiling. This asymmetry can be caused by paralysis of the marginal mandibular branch of the facial nerve on one side, so the healthy side may be cut to create symmetry. Local anaesthesia may be used, such as by blocking the mental nerve. This operation tends to be successful.

History 
The depressor labii inferioris muscle has also (mainly historically) been called the quadratus labii inferioris muscle.

See also 
 Facial muscles
 Depressor anguli oris muscle

Additional images

References 

Muscles of the head and neck